Sodium channel subunit beta-3 is a protein that in humans is encoded by the SCN3B gene. Two alternatively spliced variants, encoding the same protein, have been identified.

Function 

Voltage-gated sodium channels are transmembrane glycoprotein complexes composed of a large alpha subunit and one or more regulatory beta subunits. They are responsible for the generation and propagation of action potentials in neurons and muscle. This gene encodes one member of the sodium channel beta subunit gene family, and influences the inactivation kinetics of the sodium channel.

Clinical significance 

Mutations in the gene are associated with abnormal cardiac electrophysiology.

See also
 Sodium channel

References

Further reading

External links
  GeneReviews/NIH/NCBI/UW entry on Brugada syndrome
 

Sodium channels